Eduardo Herrera (born 25 August 1944) is a Chilean footballer. He played in 21 matches for the Chile national football team from 1967 to 1973. He was also part of Chile's squad for the 1967 South American Championship.

References

External links
 

1944 births
Living people
Chilean footballers
Chile international footballers
Association football defenders
People from Rancagua